The Houston Rockets joined the NBA in 1967 as the San Diego Rockets, and moved to Houston in 1971, where they have been located ever since.

In the first four drafts the Rockets participated in, each team had a total of 90 draft choices (14 in 1967, and 19 each from 1968 to 1971). For two drafts in 1972 and 1973, there were eight rounds, from 1974 to 1976 and 1978 to 1984, the draft was 10 rounds long. However, in 1985, the draft was shortened to seven rounds, and in 1989, the NBA agreed with the National Basketball Players' Association to limit drafts to two rounds, an arrangement that has remained the same up the present time. Before each draft, an NBA Draft Lottery determines the first round selection order for the teams that missed the playoffs during the prior season. Teams can also trade their picks, which means that in some drafts teams may have more or less than two draft picks, although they must have at least one first-round pick every other year.

In 1968, the Rockets selected Elvin Hayes, who became an eventual Hall of Famer and one of the NBA's 50 Greatest Players, with the first pick of the draft. The Rockets again had the first pick of the draft in 1984, after winning a coin flip for the first pick against the Portland Trail Blazers, and they used it to select Hakeem Olajuwon, who later led the Rockets to two consecutive NBA championships in 1994 and 1995. In 2002, the Rockets won the first pick of the 2002 NBA draft through the lottery, and they chose Yao Ming, who became a six-time All-Star before his career was prematurely ended by chronic foot and ankle injuries.

Key

Selections

Footnotes
 On June 7, 1976, the Rockets traded Joe Meriweather, Gus Bailey and their first round draft pick to the Atlanta Hawks for Atlanta's first-round draft pick.
 On June 9, 1977, the Rockets traded John Johnson to the Boston Celtics for Boston's 1977 and 1978 second-round draft picks.
 On October 22, 1977, the Rockets traded John Johnson to the Seattle SuperSonics for Seattle's 1979 and 1980 second-round draft picks.
 On October 12, 1979, the Rockets traded Mike Newlin to the New Jersey Nets for cash and New Jersey's 1980 second-round draft pick.
 On June 9, 1978, the Boston Celtics signed Kevin Kunnert, and in compensation, the Rockets received cash and the Celtics' 1981 second-round draft pick.
 On 27 June 1990, Houston traded Alec Kessler to the Miami Heat for Dave Jamerson and Carl Herrera.
 On 26 June 1991, Houston traded Keith Hughes to the Cleveland Cavaliers for a second round draft in 1996 and future considerations.
 On February 27, 1990, Houston traded Derrick Chievous to the Cleveland Cavaliers for Cleveland's 1991, 1992, and 1993 second-round picks.
 On February 23, 1995, Houston traded Scott Brooks to the Dallas Mavericks for Morlon Wiley and Dallas's second-round pick.
 On June 19, 1996, Houston traded Pete Chilcutt, Tim Breaux, two 1996 draft picks, and a 1997 draft pick to the Vancouver Grizzlies for two 1996 draft picks and one 1997 draft pick.
 On August, 1996, Houston traded Chucky Brown, Mark Bryant, Sam Cassell, and Robert Horry to the Phoenix Suns in exchange for Charles Barkley and a 1999 second-round draft pick.
 On June 28, 2008, Houston traded Joel Przybilla to the Milwaukee Bucks in exchange for Jason Collier and a future first-round draft pick.
 On June 28, 2008, Houston traded Eduardo Nájera and a future second-round draft pick to the Dallas Mavericks in exchange for Dan Langhi.
 On June 27, 2001, the Rockets traded Richard Jefferson, Jason Collins, and Brandon Armstrong to the New Jersey Nets for Eddie Griffin.
 On June 2, 2002, the Rockets traded their 22nd first-round pick to the Orlando Magic for their 23rd first-round pick.
 On August 2, 2001, the Rockets traded Hakeem Olajuwon to the Toronto Raptors for future first and second-round draft picks.
 On June 18, 2002, the Rockets traded their second-round pick to the Miami Heat for the Heat's second-round pick.
 On June 28, 2006, the Rockets traded Stromile Swift and the draft rights to Rudy Gay to the Memphis Grizzlies for Shane Battier.
 On June 28, 2007, the Rockets traded cash considerations and a future second-round pick to the Seattle SuperSonics in exchange for the draft rights to Carl Landry.
 On July 17, 2007, the Rockets traded Greek guard Vassilis Spanoulis and a 2009 second-round pick to the San Antonio Spurs in exchange for reserve center Jackie Butler and the draft rights to Luis Scola.
 On June 26, 2008, the Rockets completed a three-way transaction that sent Nicolas Batum to the Portland Trail Blazers, Darrell Arthur to the Memphis Grizzlies and Donté Greene and Joey Dorsey and Memphis's 2009 second-round pick to the Rockets.
 On June 25, 2009, the Rockets spent roughly $6 million to acquire the 32nd, 34th, and 44th picks in the second-round from the Washington Wizards, the Denver Nuggets, and the Detroit Pistons, respectively.
 On June 23, 2011, the Rockets acquired point guard Jonny Flynn and Lithuanian big man (Minnesota's 20th pick) Donatas Motiejūnas in a trade with Minnesota Timberwolves during Thursday night's NBA draft and sent center Brad Miller and Houston's 23rd pick (Nikola Mirotić) to the Minnesota Timberwolves.
 On June 30, 2012, the Rockets acquired the draft rights to Furkan Aldemir from the Los Angeles Clippers in a trade with three other teams:  Los Angeles Clippers, Dallas Mavericks, and Utah Jazz.
 On February 21, 2013, the Rockets acquired the Phoenix Suns' 2013 second round pick (the 34th pick) in exchange for Marcus Morris.
 On July 11, 2012, the Rockets acquired the New York Knicks' 2014 second-round pick (the 42nd pick), along with three players and a 2015 second-round pick (the 32nd pick), in exchange for Marcus Camby.
 On July 15, 2014, the Houston Rockets acquired Alonzo Gee, Scotty Hopson and a conditional 2015 first-round pick (protected top 3 and 20–30 in 2015) from New Orleans and Trevor Ariza from Washington (sign and trade) in exchange for Ömer Aşık, Omri Casspi and cash considerations (to Houston), while Washington Wizards also acquired Melvin Ely from New Orleans.
On September 17, 2014, the Rockets acquired Jason Terry, a 2015 second-round pick, and Portland's 2016 second-round pick from Sacramento in exchange for Alonzo Gee, Scotty Hopson, and a trade exception. Previously, on July 10, 2013, the Kings acquired a 2016 second round pick (with an option to swap selections with New Orleans) and a 2018 second round pick from Portland in a three-team trade with New Orleans Pelicans. Previously, on July 15, 2012, the Knicks acquired Raymond Felton and Kurt Thomas from the Portland Trail Blazers in exchange for Jared Jeffries, the rights to Dan Gadzuric, the future selections of Kostas Papanikolaou and Georgios Printezis, and their 2016 second round selection.
On July 20, 2015, Houston acquired Ty Lawson and Denver's 2017 second-round pick for Joey Dorsey, Nick Johnson, Kostas Papanikolaou, Pablo Prigioni, Houston's 2016 lottery-protected first-round pick, and cash considerations.
On July 10, 2013, Houston acquired draft rights to #45 Marko Todorović, draft rights to 2012 #48 Kostas Papanikolaou, and two future second-round picks from Portland for Thomas Robinson
On June 22, 2017, Memphis acquired Houston's second-round pick (No. 45) for the Grizzlies' future second-round pick.
On June 22, 2017, Houston acquired the worst 2018 second-round pick between Charlotte, Memphis, and Miami from Memphis for the draft rights to Dillon Brooks. Previously, on February 16, 2016, Memphis acquired Chris Andersen, a 2018 second-round pick, and a top-55 protected 2019 second-round pick from Miami in a three-team trade with Charlotte.
On November 22, 2020, Houston acquired a protected 2021 first round draft pick in exchange for Trevor Ariza and Isaiah Stewart
On March 29, 2021, Houston acquired D. J. Augustin, D. J. Wilson, a 2023 first-round pick, and option to swap a 2021 second-round pick with Milwaukee's 2021 first-round pick 
 On January 16, 2021, Houston acquired Victor Oladipo, Dante Exum, Rodions Kurucs, a 2022 first-round draft selection, 2024 first-round draft selection, 2026 first-round draft selection, rights to swap first-round draft selections in 2021, 2023, 2025, and 2027, and a 2022 first-round draft selection (from Milwaukee) for James Harden

Citations

References
 
 
 

 
National Basketball Association draft
draft history